(born September 8, 1964) is a Japanese politician and the governor of Miyazaki Prefecture in Japan. In 2014, he was re-elected for a second term as the Miyazaki governor.

Biography
Kōno was born on 8 September 1964 in Kure, Hiroshima.

References

External links
  

1964 births
Living people
Politicians from Hiroshima Prefecture
University of Tokyo alumni
Governors of Miyazaki Prefecture